The Bird Cage Theatre was a theater in Tombstone, Arizona. It operated intermittently from December 1881 to 1894. When the silver mines closed, the theatre was also closed in 1892. It was leased as a coffee shop starting in 1934.

History 
The Bird Cage Theatre opened on December 26, 1881. It was owned by Lottie and William "Billy" Hutchinson.  Hutchison, a variety performer, originally intended to present respectable family shows like he'd seen in San Francisco that were thronged by large crowds. After the Theatre opened, they hosted a Ladies Night for the respectable women of Tombstone, who could attend for free. But the economics of Tombstone didn't support their aspirations. They soon canceled the Ladies Night and began offering baser entertainment that appealed to the rough mining crowd.

The walls of the Bird Cage were riddled with gunshot holes from shootins by gunfighters of the American frontier. There were 12 balcony boxes where prostitutes worked.

Entertainment 

One of the first acts at the Bird Cage was Mademoiselle De Granville (Alma Hayes), also known as the "Female Hercules" and "the woman with the iron jaw". She performed feats of strength, specializing in picking up heavy objects with her teeth. Other acts included the Irish comic duo Burns and Trayers (John H. Burns and Matthew Trayers); comic singer Irene Baker; Carrie Delmar, a serious opera singer; and comedian Nola Forest.
Entertainment included masquerade balls featuring cross-dressing entertainers, like comedians David Waters and Will Curlew. Miners could drink and dance all night if they chose.

One of the prime entertainments at the Bird Cage theatre was Cornish wrestling competitions, with the results being regularly published in the UK.

Stage magic shows were also popular at the Bird Cage with one magician saying he could catch bullets with his teeth and barely escaping with his life when someone who was not part of the show challenged him.

Longest poker game
The longest poker game in history was played in the basement of the theater. Those who wished to play had to buy-in for a thousand dollars ($1,000) up front. Among the notable people who played in this particular game were George Hearst, Diamond Jim Brady, Adolphus Busch, Doc Holliday, Bat Masterson, and Wyatt Earp. The poker game was played continuously 24 hours a day, 7 days a week. It continued from 1881 to 1889 for a total of eight years. It is estimated that approximately $10 million was exchanged in the game during the eight years that it lasted and that the Bird Cage retained ten percent of that money.

Closing 

The flow wasn't at first large enough to stop work, but constant pumping with a  pump was soon insufficient. The silver ore deposits they sought were soon underwater. Hutchinson sold the Bird Cage to Hugh McCrum and John Stroufe. Bignon had managed the Theatre Comique in San Francisco and performed as a blackface minstrel and clog dancer. He refurbished the building and renamed it the Elite Theatre. He hired new acts. She wore pink tights and sang, danced, and played the piano.

The large Cornish engines brought in by the mine owners kept the water pumped out of the mines for a few more years, but on May 26, 1886, the Grand Central Mine hoist and pumping plant burned. When the price of silver slid to 90 cents an ounce a few months later, the remaining mines laid off workers. Many residents of Tombstone left. The Bird Cage Theatre closed in 1892.

Haunting 

The theater is reported to be haunted. It was featured in the paranormal investigation shows Ghost Hunters in 2006, Ghost Adventures in 2009 and 2015, Ghost Lab in 2009, and Fact or Faked: Paranormal Files in 2011.

In popular culture 
The theatre is featured in the movie "Tombstone", a 1993 American Western film, about the lives of Wyatt Earp, Virgil Earp, Morgan Earp, and Doc Holliday.

Gallery

References

External links 

 
 Bird Cage Theatre at Ghost Compendium

American frontier
American West museums in Arizona
History museums in Arizona
History of Cochise County, Arizona
Museums in Cochise County, Arizona
Reportedly haunted locations in Arizona
Roadside attractions in Arizona
Theatre museums in the United States
Theatres in Arizona
Tombstone, Arizona
1881 establishments in Arizona Territory